Ashley Blurton (born 5 March 1975) is an indigenous former  Australian rules football player who played in the AFL between 1995 and 1997 for the West Coast Eagles Football Club and in 1998 and 1999 for the Richmond Football Club.

External links
 
 

Indigenous Australian players of Australian rules football
Richmond Football Club players
West Coast Eagles players
West Perth Football Club players
Australian rules footballers from Western Australia
Living people
1975 births
Peel Thunder Football Club players